Frank Minion  (born January 3, 1929 in Baltimore) is an American jazz and bop singer, with some rhythm and blues and reggae influences. In 1954 he covered "How High the Moon" and "Sweet Lorraine". He later worked with Roland Alexander. In 1960 he released the album The Soft Land of Make Believe on the Victor Records label, accompanied by Bill Evans. Some of his best known recordings include "Introduction to Black Opium Street", "How Much Land (Does A Man Need)", and "Watermelon" (1960). He also did a notable cover of Cole Porter's "Night and Day".

References

External links

1929 births
Living people
Bebop singers
American jazz singers
American reggae musicians
Musicians from Baltimore
Singers from Maryland
Jazz musicians from Maryland